The 1989 VII ACB International Tournament "VI Memorial Héctor Quiroga" was the 7th semi-official edition of the European Basketball Club Super Cup. It took place at Pabellón Municipal de Puerto Real, Puerto Real, Spain, on 8, 9 and 10 October 1989 with the participations of Jugoplastika (champions of the 1988–89 FIBA European Champions Cup), Real Madrid (champions of the 1988–89 FIBA European Cup Winner's Cup), FC Barcelona Banca Catalana (champions of the 1988–89 Liga ACB) and Philips Milano (champions of the 1988–89 Serie A1 FIP). Fourteen days earlier (on 26 September and on 3 October) was due to take place the 1989 FIBA European Super Cup, but finally was suspended and not organized by the late appearance of Jugoplastika, claiming the Yugoslav club was unwilling to make an economic effort for the trip (despite some days later to play the ACB International Tournament), for a competition still young.

League stage
Day 1, October 8, 1989

|}

Day 2, October 9, 1989

|}

Day 3, October 10, 1989

|}

Final standings 

European Basketball Club Super Cup
1989–90 in European basketball
1989–90 in Spanish basketball
1989–90 in Italian basketball
1989–90 in Yugoslav basketball
International basketball competitions hosted by Spain